The 1986–87 Hamburger SV season was the 40th season in the club's history and the 24th consecutive season playing in the Bundesliga.

On 20 June 1987, HSV defeated Stuttgarter Kickers 3–1 in the final of the DFB-Pokal. It was Hamburg's third time lifting the German Cup and as of 2021, it remains the last major honour that the club has won.

It was also the final season that Austrian Ernst Happel managed the club as he stepped down following the DFB-Pokal success to return to Austria and manager FC Swarovski Tirol. He would be replaced by legendary Croatian striker Josip Skoblar who would himself be sacked just two months into the following season.

Competitions

Overview

Bundesliga

League table

DFB Pokal

Results

Statistics

Goalscorers

References

Hamburger SV seasons
Hamburger